Boisselot is a French surname and may refer to:

 Charles Boisselot (1784–1851), dramatic artist
 Paul-Louis Boisselot (1829–1905), playwright and vaudeville actor

Members of the large Boisselot family of instrument makers are:

 Antoine Boisselot (?–c. 1780), luthier and tourneur 
 Claude Boisselot (1755–?), luthier 
 Jean-Louis Boisselot (1782–1847), piano maker and owner of Boisselot & Fils
 Louis Boisselot (1754–1807), luthier and tourneur
 Louis-Constantin Boisselot (1809–1850), piano maker
 Marie-Louis-François Boisselot (1845–1902), piano maker
 Pierre Boisselot (1750–?), luthier and tabletier  
 Xavier Boisselot (1811–1893), classical composer and piano maker

Surnames of French origin
French-language surnames